Clarence Frank Buck (June 6, 1870 – September 2, 1944) was an American politician, newspaper editor, businessman, and farmer.

Biography
Buck was born in Monmouth, Illinois. He graduated from Monmouth College. He was a farmer and raised livestock. Buck served as editor of the Monmouth Daily Atlas newspaper. Buck was involved with the Republican Party and served as postmaster of Monmouth. He was also involved with the banking business. Buck served in the Illinois Senate from 1919 to 1925. 

Buck died at his home in Monmouth, Illinois.

References

External links

1870 births
1944 deaths
People from Monmouth, Illinois
Monmouth College alumni
Illinois postmasters
Businesspeople from Illinois
Editors of Illinois newspapers
Farmers from Illinois
Republican Party Illinois state senators